Travis Fiser is an American high school wrestling coach and former collegiate wrestler. He is the head coach at Grundy High School, Grundy, Virginia, and a member of the National Wrestling Hall of Fame.

Wrestling career 

Born in Marengo, Iowa, Fiser was a high school wrestler for Iowa Valley High School in Marengo, graduating in 1987. He was an Iowa High School Class 1A State Runner-Up at 167 lbs. in 1987. He continued his wrestling career at Kirkwood Community College in Cedar Rapids, Iowa, where he earned NJCAA All-American Honors in 1989. He then wrestled for wrestling legend Dan Gable at the University of Iowa where he was a two-time NCAA All-American at 190 lbs. He had an NCAA record of 72-26-5, and was a member of two NCAA National Championship teams.

Coaching career 

After graduating, Fiser wrestled for Hawkweye Wrestling Club.  After a failed bid to make the US Olympic team, he accepted a position as head wrestling coach at Grundy High School in Grundy, VA in 1996, taking over for fellow Hawkeye Kevin Dresser
 
Fiser led the Virginia powerhouse to four Virginia state titles in five years after taking over the program, and has been at the helm for 14 of Grundy's 25 state team titles:
 Virginia Class AA - 1997, 1998, 2000, 2001
 Virginia Class A - 2012, 2013
 Virginia Class 2A - 2014, 2016, 2017
 Virginia Class 1 - 2018, 2019, 2020, 2021, 2022

More than 100 individual state championship medals have been awarded to Golden Wave wrestlers under his watch, but “He doesn’t measure his success in accomplishments, accolades, state champions, state championships,” said Jimmy Griffey, a two-time state champion and a 1998 Grundy graduate. “He really doesn’t measure his success. His success is shown in the graduation rate of his wrestlers, the countless successful husbands, fathers and contributors who have been fortunate enough to have been coached by him. Those are his successes and a legacy much bigger than state championships.”

He was inducted into the National Wrestling Hall of Fame for Lifetime Service to Wrestling (Virginia) in 2019.

Personal life 
Travis is married to Jackie. Their oldest child, Gabe, is a four-time high school state wrestling champion in Virginia.

References 

Year of birth missing (living people)
Living people
People from Marengo, Iowa
American male sport wrestlers